Taper burn marks are deep flame shaped scorch marks often found on the timber beams of early modern houses. They were originally thought to have been accidental, but research suggests that most marks may have been made deliberately, as there is clear patterning of the activity. They are theorised to have been made as part of a folk superstition, then thought to protect the building from fire and lightning.

They are often found around entrances to the home such as fireplaces, doors and windows.

Over 80 such marks have been discovered in the Tower of London.

See also
Apotropaic mark

References

Anthropology of religion
Magic symbols
Folklore
Religious practices